Miss Colombia is a pageant title for the country of Colombia.

Miss Colombia or variant, may refer to:

 Miss Universe Colombia, a national female beauty pageant associated with Miss Universe
 Miss Mundo Colombia, a national female beauty pageant associated with Miss World
 Miss Tierra Colombia, a national female beauty pageant associated with Miss Earth
 Miss International Colombia, a national female beauty pageant title associated with Miss International
 Miss Maja Colombia, a national female beauty pageant that is not affiliated with a global contest

See also

 Miss Columbia (disambiguation)
 Miss District of Columbia (disambiguation)
 
 
 Colombia (disambiguation)
 Columbia (disambiguation)